Volutoidea is a taxonomic superfamily of predatory sea snails, marine gastropod mollusks in the clade Neogastropoda.

This superfamily includes the chank snails, the dove snails, the volutes, the margin snails and others.

Shell description 
The shell of the snails in this superfamily vary greatly in shape and degree of ornamentation. The shells have an oval aperture, and a noticeable siphonal canal.

Families 
Families within the superfamily Volutoidea are as follows:
 family Cancellariidae Forbes & Hanley, 1851
 family Cystiscidae Stimpson, 1865 -- 15 genera
 family Granulinidae G. A. Coovert & H. K. Coovert, 1995
 family Marginellidae Fleming, 1828 -- 30 genera
 family Marginellonidae Coan, 1965
 family Volutidae Rafinesque, 1815 -- 49 genera
Synonyms
 Paladmetidae Stephenson, 1941 † synonym of Admetinae Troschel, 1865
 Plesiocystiscidae G. A. Coovert & H. K. Coovert, 1995: synonym of Plesiocystiscinae G. A. Coovert & H. K. Coovert, 1995

References

  1997. Towards a phylogeny of gastropod molluscs: an analysis using morphological characters. Zool. J. Linn. Soc. 119(2): 83-265.
  (2017). Revised classification, nomenclator and typification of gastropod and monoplacophoran families. Malacologia. 61(1-2): 1-526.

 
Neogastropoda
Extant Cretaceous first appearances
Taxa named by Constantine Samuel Rafinesque